Areej Mohsin Haider Darwish Al-Zaabi (Arabic: أريج محسن حيدر درويش الزعابي, born 18 October 1971) is an Omani Arabian business magnate, entrepreneur, investor and billionaire. She is the daughter of Mohsin Haider Darwish Al-Zaabi, an Omani businessman. She is the Chairperson of the Automotive, Construction Equipment, and Renewable Energy (ACERE) cluster of Mohsin Haider Darwish LLC (MHD LLC); a  business house in the Middle East, which was listed in the Forbes Top 100 Arab Family Businesses in Middle East 2020. She was listed among Middle East's most powerful businesswomen by Forbes in Forbes magazine and Forbes's The Middle East's Most Powerful Businesswomen. She was also listed as a notable business woman in the Arab world in The Arab Power List 2021 and Women of Influence in Arab World 2021.Areej is on the Board of Directors of Oman Chamber of Commerce & Industry.

Biography
Areej was born in Muscat on 18 October to Mohsin Haider Darwish Al-Zaabi and Fatma Jaafar Abdulraheem. Her father was an Omani Businessman during the 1960’s. Areej Mohsin graduated from Sultan Qaboos University with a Bachelor in Computer Science. She started her career with Petroleum Development Oman as a Programmer. Areej joined the family business in 1994. She began her career with MHD LLC in the year 1994. She currently heads the ACERE cluster of the Mohsin Haider Darwish LLC (MHD LLC).

She is the chairperson of Oman Business Forum, a professional forum for facilitating discussions between the public and private sectors. She is a board member of Dar al Atta, a charitable organization, Duqum United Logistics and Muscat University. She is also member of Unicef Leadership
Circle and played an active role in Unicef’s Upshift programme in Oman. She was part of the Oman India delegation which visited India to strengthen trade and economic ties between the two countries. She is also part of Friendship Associations, namely Oman Kuwait
Friendship Association, Oman Bahrain friendship Association, Oman India Friendship Association and Oman Turkey Friendship Association.

See Also
 Lujaina Mohsin Darwish
 Mohsin Hani

References

1971 births
Living people
Omani businesspeople
Omani billionaires
Giving Pledgers
21st-century philanthropists